Danica Grujičić (born 30 August 1959) is a Serbian doctor, neurosurgeon specialist, and politician serving as minister of health since 2022.

A member of the Democratic Party (DS) from 2004 to 2011, she left DS in 2011 and was elected vice president of the Social Democratic Alliance (SDS). Grujičić participated in the 2012 Serbian presidential election, finishing last with 0.78% of the votes. In February 2022, she became affiliated with the Serbian Progressive Party (SNS) and it was announced that she would be the ballot carrier of the SNS-led coalition's Together We Can Do Everything ballot list in the 2022 parliamentary election. She is the  current head of the Center for Neuro-oncology of the Neurosurgical Clinic of the Clinical Centre of Serbia and a professor at the Faculty of Medicine in Belgrade.

References 

1959 births
Living people
People from Užice
Democratic Party (Serbia) politicians
Social Democratic Alliance (Serbia) politicians
Candidates for President of Serbia
Members of the National Assembly (Serbia)
University of Belgrade Faculty of Medicine alumni
Serbian surgeons
Independent politicians in Serbia